Rosy Business is a 2009 Hong Kong TVB television drama.

Awards and nominations

TVB Anniversary Awards

Mingpao Magazine Entertainment Awards

 The 1st drama to win all 4 awards in TV category

Yahoo! Asia Buzz Awards

TV Programme Appreciation Index Survey

The 1st TV drama to get the 1st position since the survey started in 1998.

Next Magazine Awards

New York Television Festival
 Best Performance Talent Credits: Wayne Lai

Lists of awards by television series